Sister Veronika is a 1927 German silent drama film directed by Gerhard Lamprecht and starring Aud Egede-Nissen, Paul Richter, and Hilde Maroff. The film's art direction was by Otto Moldenhauer. It was based on a play by Hans Müller. It premiered on 12 February 1927.

Cast

References

External links

1927 drama films
German drama films
German silent feature films
Films directed by Gerhard Lamprecht
German films based on plays
Films of the Weimar Republic
National Film films
German black-and-white films
Silent drama films
1920s German films
1920s German-language films